The Baeksang Arts Award for Best Male Variety Performer is annually presented at the Baeksang Arts Awards ceremony.

List of winners

Sources

External links 
  

Baeksang Arts Awards (television)